Ciolănești is a commune in Teleorman County, Muntenia, Romania. It is composed of three villages: Baldovinești, Ciolăneștii din Deal (the commune center) and Ciolăneștii din Vale.

References

Communes in Teleorman County
Localities in Muntenia